Thomas M. Bell (born Cleveland, Ohio) is an American politician who served as a Democratic representative in the Ohio House of Representatives, 1973–1982.  He was in his early 20s when elected to the state legislature.

References

1950s births
Living people
Democratic Party members of the Ohio House of Representatives
Politicians from Cleveland